Deb (داب ) is the 2003 second album of Souad Massi.

Track listing 
Ya Kelbi
Ghir Enta (غير انت)
Ech Edani
Yemma
Yawlidi (يا ولدي)
Le Bien Et Le Mal
Houria
Deb (داب)
Moudja
Passe Le Temps
Theghri
Beb El Madhi

References

Souad Massi albums
2003 albums